TUM Aerocarga (Formerly called MCS Aerocarga) is a Mexican cargo airline owned by MCS Holding Cargo Services and Grupo TUM.

History
MCS Aerocarga emerged in 2015 through the joint participation between MCS Holding Cargo Services and Grupo TUM, based on operations at Mexico City International Airport, in order to generate a regular air cargo service taking advantage of the logistics network of both companies. Previously, MCS Holding Cargo Services operated air cargo through other airlines such as Volaris Carga and Lufthansa. However, excess baggage and the delay or cancellation of commercial flights with passengers made it difficult to transport express cargo, so in association With Grupo TUM and its close relationship with FedEx, it began the creation of a cargo airline, which entered service with a Bombardier CRJ-100 in July 2015.

The airline acquired two more Bombardier CRJ-100 aircraft during 2015, and a CRJ-200 aircraft in 2017. By January 2018 the airline changed its name to TUM AeroCarga and in July of that same year it acquired a Boeing 737-300 converted to freighter, which was previously in service with Air Costa Rica.

Due to the difficulties with the allocation of slots at Mexico City International Airport, the airline moved its operations to Toluca Airport in May 2017, allowing for greater punctuality in the itineraries and greater efficiency in cargo operations.

In 2021, TUM Aerocarga is planning on starting a new low-cost airline named VLU. The new airline would operate 5 Bombardier CRJ-200 aircraft and be based out of Toluca International Airport.

Fleet
As of November 2022, TUM Aerocarga had 12 airplanes, with an average age of 27.6 years:

Destinations 
TUM Aerocarga currently serves 25 destinations in 7 routes

References

External links
MCS Holding
Grupo TUM

Cargo airlines of Mexico